The 200 metres, or 200-meter dash, is a sprint running event. On an outdoor 400 metre racetrack, the race begins on the curve and ends on the home straight, so a combination of techniques is needed to successfully run the race. A slightly shorter race, called the stadion and run on a straight track, was the first recorded event at the ancient Olympic Games. The 200 m places more emphasis on speed endurance than shorter sprint distances as athletes predominantly rely on anaerobic energy system during the 200 m sprint. Similarly to other sprint distances, the 200 m begins from the starting blocks. When the sprinters adopt the 'set' position in the blocks they are able to adopt a more efficient starting posture and isometrically preload their muscles. This enables them to stride forwards more powerfully when the race begins and start faster.

In the United States and elsewhere, athletes previously ran the 220-yard dash (201.168 m) instead of the 200 m (218.723 yards), though the distance is now obsolete. The standard adjustment used for the conversion from times recorded over 220 yards to 200 m times is to subtract 0.1 seconds, but other conversion methods exist.  Another obsolete version of this race is the 200 metres straight, which was run on tracks that contained such a straight. Initially, when the International Amateur Athletic Association (now known as the International Association of Athletics Federations) started to ratify world records in 1912, only records set on a straight track were eligible for consideration. In 1951, the IAAF started to recognise records set on a curved track. In 1976, the straight record was discarded.

The race attracts runners from other events, primarily the 100 metres, wishing to double up and claim both titles. This feat has been achieved by men eleven times at the Olympic Games: by Archie Hahn in 1904, Ralph Craig in 1912, Percy Williams in 1928, Eddie Tolan in 1932, Jesse Owens in 1936, Bobby Morrow in 1956, Valeriy Borzov in 1972, Carl Lewis in 1984, and most recently by Jamaica's Usain Bolt in 2008, 2012, and 2016.  The double has been accomplished by women eight times: by Fanny Blankers-Koen in 1948, Marjorie Jackson in 1952, Betty Cuthbert in 1956, Wilma Rudolph in 1960, Renate Stecher in 1972, Florence Griffith-Joyner in 1988, and Elaine Thompson-Herah in 2016 and 2021.  Marion Jones finished first in both races in 2000 but was later disqualified and stripped of her medals after admitting to taking performance-enhancing drugs. An Olympic double of 200 m and 400 m was first achieved by Valerie Brisco-Hooks in 1984, and later by Michael Johnson from the United States and Marie-José Pérec of France both in 1996. Usain Bolt is the only man to repeat as Olympic champion, Bärbel Wöckel (née Eckert), Veronica Campbell-Brown and Elaine Thompson-Herah are the three women who have repeated as Olympic champion.

The men's world record holder is Usain Bolt of Jamaica, who ran 19.19 s at the 2009 World Championships. The women's world record holder is Florence Griffith-Joyner of the United States, who ran 21.34 s at the 1988 Summer Olympics. The reigning Olympic champions are Andre De Grasse (CAN) and Elaine Thompson-Herah (JAM).  The reigning World Champions are Noah Lyles (USA) and Shericka Jackson (JAM).

Races run with an aiding wind measured over 2.0 metres per second are not acceptable for record purposes.

Continental records
Updated 22 October 2019.

Notes 

 Represents a mark set at a high altitude.

All-time top 25

Men (outdoor)

Updated September 2022

Assisted marks
Any performance with a following wind of more than 2.0 metres per second is not counted for record purposes. Below is a list of wind-assisted times (equal or superior to 19.70). Only times that are superior to legal bests are shown:
Kenny Bednarek ran 19.49 (+6.1 m/s) at high altitude in Hobbs, New Mexico on 17 May 2019, 19.65 (+4.0 m/s) on 10 April 2021 in Miramar, Florida, and 19.65 (+3.2 m/s) in Lausanne on 26 August 2021.
Andre De Grasse ran 19.58 (+2.4 m/s) in Eugene, Oregon on 12 June 2015.
Leroy Burrell ran 19.61 (+4.1 m/s) in College Station, Texas on 19 May 1990. Until 1 August 1996, it was the best performance in any condition.
Terrance Laird ran 19.64 (+5.6 m/s) at high altitude in Hobbs, New Mexico on 17 May 2019.

Women (outdoor)

Updated July 2022

Assisted marks
Any performance with a following wind of more than 2.0 metres per second is not counted for record purposes. Below is a list of wind-assisted times (equal or superior to 21.80). Only times that are superior to legal bests are shown:
Tamara Clark ran 21.72 (+3.1 m/s) in Austin, Texas on 26 March 2022.
Kimberlyn Duncan ran 21.80 (+3.2 m/s) in Des Moines, Iowa on 23 June 2013.

Men (indoor)
Updated March 2023.

Notes
Below is a list of other times equal or superior to 20.31:
Frankie Fredericks also ran 20.10 (1999), 20.18 (1999) and 20.26 (1995).
Wallace Spearmon also ran 20.10 (2005), 20.19 (2008) and 20.21 (2005).
Divine Oduduru also ran 20.18 (2018) and 20.21 (2018).
Matthew Boling also ran 20.19 (2021) and 20.27 (2022), 20.31 (2023).
Tarsis Orogot also ran 20.20  (2023 x 2).
Trayvon Bromell also ran 20.23 (2015).
Elijah Hall also ran 20.26 (2018).
Robert Gregory also ran 20.27  (2023).
Terrance Laird also ran 20.28 (2021).
Cameron Miller also ran 20.29  (2023).
Shawn Crawford also ran 20.30 (2002).

Women (indoor)
Updated March 2023.

Notes
Below is a list of other times equal or superior to 22.46:
Irina Privalova also ran 22.15 (1993), 22.16 (1994), 22.26 (1992), 22.32 (1995), 22.36 (1992), 22.41 (1991) and 22.45 (1991).
Abby Steiner also ran 22.16 (2022), 22.37 (2022), 22.38 (2021), 22.41 (2021), 22.45 (2022).
Favour Ofili also ran 22.20  (2023), 22.36 (2023), 22.46 (2022).
Merlene Ottey also twice ran 22.24 (1991), 22.34 (1989) and 22.37 (1991).
Julien Alfred also ran 22.26 (2023).
Veronica Campbell-Brown also ran 22.43 (2004).
Autumn Wilson also ran 22.45  (2023).

Olympic medalists

Men

Women

World Championships medalists

Men

Women

World Indoor Championships medalists

Men

Women

 Known as the World Indoor Games

Season's best

Men

Women

References

External links
IAAF list of 200-metres records in XML
All time 200m men records

 
Events in track and field
Sprint (running)
Summer Olympic disciplines in athletics
Articles containing video clips